

This is a list of the National Register of Historic Places listings in Summit County, Ohio.

This is intended to be a complete list of the properties and districts on the National Register of Historic Places in Summit County, Ohio, United States. Latitude and longitude coordinates are provided for many National Register properties and districts; these locations may be seen together in an online map.

There are 184 properties and districts listed on the National Register in the county, including 3 National Historic Landmarks. The city of Akron is the location of 60 of these properties and districts, including 2 of the National Historic Landmarks; they are listed separately, while the 125 properties and districts and the National Historic Landmarks in the remaining parts of the county are listed here. One district, the Valley Railway Historic District, is split between Akron and other parts of the county, and is thus included on both lists. Another 2 properties were once listed but have been removed.

Current listings

Akron

Outside Akron

|}

Former listings

|}

See also

 List of National Historic Landmarks in Ohio
 Listings in neighboring counties: Cuyahoga, Geauga, Medina, Portage, Stark, Wayne
 National Register of Historic Places listings in Ohio

References

External links
 Akron-Summit County Public Library: Special Collections Division

 
Summit